Moeder (literally meaning "Mother") was a Dutch women's magazine, published from 1934 to 1974; from 1961 on the magazine was called De Prinses (literally "The Princess"). Edited by Jan Waterink, a preacher and professor and later rector at the VU University Amsterdam, it was a Christian weekly offering practical advice to housewives, combined with amusement and religious content. The magazine had a neo-Calvinist stance.

In the 1940s, the magazine had a readership of around 10,000; by 1961 when it changed its name to De Prinses, it had a circulation of 201,000, competitive with non-denominational magazines such as Libelle and Margriet. Unlike those two magazines, however, De Prinses did not manage to navigate the great changes in Dutch society of the late 1960s; secularization and depillarization greatly lessened the need for Protestant women's publications.

References

1934 establishments in the Netherlands
1974 disestablishments in the Netherlands
Christian magazines
Defunct magazines published in the Netherlands
Dutch-language magazines
Weekly magazines published in the Netherlands
Women's magazines published in the Netherlands
Magazines established in 1934
Magazines disestablished in 1974